Honeymoon Bay is located on the Freycinet Peninsula of Tasmania.

It is a bay within a bay, being part of the larger Coles Bay.

It is a popular destination for picnics, birdwatching and snorkeling.

Notes

East Coast Tasmania
Bays of Tasmania